Blood of the Leopard is a 1972 Taiwanese - Hong Kong kung fu action film directed by Lung Chien.

Cast
Sun Yueh
Kong Ban
Wang Tai Lang
Chan Hung Lit
Cheung Ching Ching
Ma Kei
Got Siu Bo
O Yau Man
Hon Kong

External links

 Blood of the Leopard at HKcinemamagic.com

1972 films
Taiwanese martial arts films
Hong Kong martial arts films
1970s action films
Kung fu films
1970s Mandarin-language films
Shaw Brothers Studio films
Films directed by Lung Chien
1970s Hong Kong films